Manouri is a Greek semi-soft, fresh white mixed milk-whey cheese made from goat or sheep milk as a by-product following the production of feta. It is produced primarily in Thessalia and Macedonia in central and northern Greece.

Manouri is creamier than feta, because of the addition of cream to the whey. It has about 36-38% fat, but only 0.8% salt content, making it much less salty than feta. It is used in salads, pastries, or as a dessert cheese. It can be substituted for cream cheese in dishes such as cheesecake.

Manouri was featured in the Washington Post:
"Manouri’s light aroma is slightly sour, similar to that of fresh yogurt, but it lacks yogurt’s (or feta’s) acidity. Instead, it has a clean, subtle nutty flavor with a bit of sheepiness and the barest hint of tang. What really elevates the cheese, though, is its texture."

Manouri has PDO status.

See also
 List of cheeses
Mizithra - Another Greek sheep cheese with very similar flavor, but more dry

References

Greek cheeses
Sheep's-milk cheeses
Goat's-milk cheeses
Whey cheeses
Greek products with protected designation of origin
Cheeses with designation of origin protected in the European Union
Greek Macedonian cuisine